The 43rd National Hockey League All-Star Game was contested at The Spectrum in Philadelphia on 18 January 1992. It featured 16 goals as the Campbell Conference defeated the Wales Conference, 10–6.  Brett Hull was named as the All-Star M.V.P. by recording two goals and one assist, while playing on a line with Los Angeles Kings' Wayne Gretzky and Luc Robitaille. This was also the first All-Star Game in which the San Jose Sharks sent a representative.

A weekend of "firsts"
For the first time, the responsibility to choose the non-starting members of the teams was transferred to a committee of general managers.  The breadth of NHL talent available was highlighted  as 13 players made their All-Star debut.  Seven of those players would also score their first-ever All-Star goals that included first-timers Owen Nolan, Alexander Mogilny, Gary Roberts and Randy Burridge.

Also for the first time, not a single penalty was called and three goaltenders were employed for each team, with each goalie playing one period.  Previously, two goaltenders had shared duties, switching halfway through the second period.

Lastly, the Fastest Skater event was introduced in the Super Skills Competition.

Uniforms
As part of the NHL's 75th anniversary celebrations, the league used modernized versions of the All-Star uniforms worn between 1947 and 1959. As the home team, the Wales Conference wore white uniforms with a red and blue sleeve stripe pattern, and blue trim, while the Campbell conference wore red uniforms with blue and white sleeve stripes and white trim. The NHL 75th anniversary patch was worn on the upper left chest. No additional shoulder patches were worn, making this the first All-Star event since before Rendez-Vous '87 not to feature the logo for the game itself.

Super Skills Competition
The Super Skills Competition required five tie-breaking penalty shots, until Mario Lemieux scored to claim the victory for the Wales Conference. In addition, Ray Bourque set a record by hitting four targets on four shots in the Accuracy Shooting event and in the inaugural Fastest Skater event finals, Sergei Fedorov defeated his former Soviet linemate Alexander Mogilny in a photo finish.

Individual Event winners
 Fastest Skater - Sergei Fedorov (Detroit Red Wings) - 14.363 seconds
 Accuracy Shooting - Ray Bourque (Boston Bruins) - 4 hits, 4 shots
 Hardest Shot - Al MacInnis (Calgary Flames) - 93.0 mph
 Goaltenders Competition - Mike Richter (New York Rangers) - 2 GA, 25 shots

The game

Summary

 Referee: Don Koharski
 Linesmen: Mark Pare, Mark Vines
 TV: NBC, TSN, SRC

Rosters

Notes

Bob "The Badger" Johnson was the head coach of the Pittsburgh Penguins when they won the Stanley Cup in the 1990–91 season.  Shortly after winning the Cup, Johnson was diagnosed with brain cancer and turned his coaching duties over to Scotty Bowman.  Johnson died of brain cancer in Colorado Springs, Colorado, on November 26, 1991.

See also
1991–92 NHL season

All-Star Game
Ice hockey competitions in Philadelphia
National Hockey League All-Star Games
1990s in Philadelphia